Georgi Daskalov (born 3 August 1981) is a Bulgarian footballer who currently plays for Germanea Sapareva Banya as a striker.

His first club was Pirin Blagoevgrad. He has also played for Belasitsa Petrich and Velbazhd Kyustendil.

References

Living people
1981 births
Bulgarian footballers
Bulgarian expatriate footballers
OFC Pirin Blagoevgrad players
PFC Belasitsa Petrich players
PFC Velbazhd Kyustendil players
FC Irtysh Pavlodar players
FC Zhetysu players
First Professional Football League (Bulgaria) players
Kazakhstan Premier League players
Bulgarian expatriate sportspeople in Kazakhstan
Expatriate footballers in Kazakhstan
Association football forwards
Sportspeople from Blagoevgrad